The Edwards River is a  tributary of the Mississippi River in northwestern Illinois in the United States. In Henry County it collects the South Edwards River, which flows past Bishop Hill.

The river was once home to a grain mill near Andover, Illinois. Several sections of the Edwards River's course have been straightened and channelized.

See also
List of Illinois rivers

References

Rivers of Illinois
Tributaries of the Mississippi River
Rivers of Henry County, Illinois
Rivers of Mercer County, Illinois